Unset may refer to:

Places
 Unset, Norway, a small village in Rendalen municipality in Innlandet county, Norway

Other
 Unset (Unix), a Unix command

See also
 Sigrid Undset (1882–1949), Norwegian novelist who was awarded the Nobel Prize for Literature in 1928.